Karl Hugo Freiherr von Weizsäcker (25 February 1853 – 2 February 1926) was a German politician who served as Prime Minister of the Kingdom of Württemberg, and a member of the prominent Weizsäcker family.

He was born Karl Hugo Weizsäcker in Stuttgart, the son of the theologian Karl Heinrich Weizsäcker and his wife, the former Auguste Sophie Christiane Dahm. While serving as a politician at the court of the Kingdom of Württemberg, his family was raised to nobility as von Weizsäcker.

Weizsäcker studied at the University of Tübingen. While serving in the administration of King William II of Württemberg, he was raised to personal nobility on 24 February 1897.

From 1900 onwards, he served as Minister of Culture — until 4 December 1906 when he was made Prime Minister. He served in this office until 6 November 1918, shortly before the monarchy was abolished in the German Revolution of 1918–1919.

In 1916, he and his family were raised to the hereditary noble title of Baron (Freiherr).

Weizsäcker was the father of Ernst von Weizsäcker and thus grandfather of the physicist Carl Friedrich von Weizsäcker and of Richard von Weizsäcker, who was President of Germany 1984-94. He died in Stuttgart in 1926.

Notes

1853 births
1926 deaths
Barons of Germany
Karl
Politicians from Stuttgart
Members of the Privy Council of Württemberg
Grand Crosses of the Order of Saint Stephen of Hungary